The 2022 New South Wales Rugby League Presidents Cup will be a competition to determine the best semi-professional Rugby League team in New South Wales. It will be the third season of the competition. The 2022 season will add the Western Conference into the competition, which brings the conferences up to 4 (Central, Northern, Southern and Western). The winners of each conference will play a 2 week knockout series to determine the Presidents Cup winners.

Presidents Cup

Central Conference (Ron Massey Cup) 

The Ron Massey Cup will feature 9 teams in 2022, 2 less than the 11 in 2021. All 9 teams are based in Sydney in 2022.

Teams

Ladder

Ladder progression 

 Numbers highlighted in green indicate that the team finished the round inside the top 5.
 Numbers highlighted in blue indicates the team finished first on the ladder in that round.
 Numbers highlighted in red indicates the team finished last place on the ladder in that round.
 Underlined numbers indicate that the team had a bye during that round.

Season results

Round 1

Round 2

Round 3

Round 4

Round 5

Round 6

Round 7

Round 8

Round 9

Round 10

Round 11

Round 12

Round 13

Round 14

Round 15

Round 16

Round 17

Round 18

Finals Series 

Grand Final

Northern Conference (Denton Engineering Cup) 

The Denton Engineering Cup will feature 10 teams in 2022, the same number as 2021.

Teams

Team of the Year 
On Saturday 24th September 2022, the Newcastle Rugby League announced the Team of the Year and Player of the Year.

Fullback - Cameron Anderson (Central Newcastle)

Winger - James Bradley (Maitland Pickers)

Centre - Matt Soper-Lawler (Maitland Pickers)

Five-Eighth - Ryan Glanville (South Newcastle Lions)

Halfback - Luke Walsh (Central Newcastle)

Prop - Jayden Butterfield (Maitland Pickers)

Hooker - Mitch Williams (Wyong Roos)

Second Row - Lewis Hamilton (South Newcastle Lions)

Lock - Luke Higgins (Macquarie Scorpions)

Coach - Phil Williams (Central Newcastle)

Player of the Year - Luke Walsh (Central Newcastle)

Ladder

Ladder progression 

 Numbers highlighted in green indicate that the team finished the round inside the top 5.
 Numbers highlighted in blue indicates the team finished first on the ladder in that round.
 Numbers highlighted in red indicates the team finished last place on the ladder in that round.
 Underlined numbers indicate that the team had a bye during that round.

Season results

Round 1

Round 2

Round 3

Round 4

Round 5

Round 6

Round 7

Round 8

Round 9

Round 10

Round 11

Round 12

Round 13

Round 14

Round 15

Round 16

Round 17

Round 18

Finals Series

Southern Conference (Mojo Homes Illawarra Cup) 

The 2022 Mojo Homes Illawarra Cup will feature 8 teams, up 3 from the 5 that competed in 2021.

Teams

Ladder

Ladder progression 

 Numbers highlighted in green indicate that the team finished the round inside the top 4.
 Numbers highlighted in blue indicates the team finished first on the ladder in that round.
 Numbers highlighted in red indicates the team finished last place on the ladder in that round.
 Underlined numbers indicate that the team had a bye during that round.

Season results

Round 1

Round 2

Round 3

Round 4

Round 5

Round 6

Round 7

Round 8

Round 9

Round 10

Round 11

Round 12

Round 13

Round 14

Finals Series 

Grand Final

Western Conference (Peter McDonald Premiership) 

The 2022 Peter McDonald Premiership will feature a merged competition between the former Group 10 and Group 11 competitions. The competition format will be two conferences, with the top 4 from each conference qualifying for an 8 team finals series. The winner of each conference will win the Group 10 and Group 11 Premierships.

Teams

Group 10

Group 11

Group 10 Ladder

Ladder progression 

 Numbers highlighted in green indicate that the team finished the round inside the top 4.
 Numbers highlighted in blue indicates the team finished first on the ladder in that round.
 Numbers highlighted in red indicates the team finished last place on the ladder in that round.
 Underlined numbers indicate that the team had a bye during that round.

Group 11 Ladder

Ladder progression 

 Numbers highlighted in green indicate that the team finished the round inside the top 4.
 Numbers highlighted in blue indicates the team finished first on the ladder in that round.
 Numbers highlighted in red indicates the team finished last place on the ladder in that round.
 Underlined numbers indicate that the team had a bye during that round.

Season results

Round 1

Round 2

Round 3

Round 4

Round 5

Round 6

Round 7

Round 8

Round 9

Round 10

Round 11

Round 12

Round 13

Round 14

Round 15

Round 16

Finals Series 

Grand Final

References

2022 in Australian rugby league
Rugby league competitions in New South Wales